The Mari El constituency (No.22) is a Russian legislative constituency covering the entirety of Mari El.

Members elected

Election results

1993

|-
! colspan=2 style="background-color:#E9E9E9;text-align:left;vertical-align:top;" |Candidate
! style="background-color:#E9E9E9;text-align:left;vertical-align:top;" |Party
! style="background-color:#E9E9E9;text-align:right;" |Votes
! style="background-color:#E9E9E9;text-align:right;" |%
|-
|style="background-color:#019CDC"|
|align=left|Anatoly Popov
|align=left|Party of Russian Unity and Accord
|
|27.78%
|-
|style="background-color:"|
|align=left|Lyudmila Ivanova
|align=left|Independent
| -
|19.50%
|-
| colspan="5" style="background-color:#E9E9E9;"|
|- style="font-weight:bold"
| colspan="3" style="text-align:left;" | Total
| 
| 100%
|-
| colspan="5" style="background-color:#E9E9E9;"|
|- style="font-weight:bold"
| colspan="4" |Source:
|
|}

1995

|-
! colspan=2 style="background-color:#E9E9E9;text-align:left;vertical-align:top;" |Candidate
! style="background-color:#E9E9E9;text-align:left;vertical-align:top;" |Party
! style="background-color:#E9E9E9;text-align:right;" |Votes
! style="background-color:#E9E9E9;text-align:right;" |%
|-
|style="background-color:"|
|align=left|Nikolay Polyakov
|align=left|Agrarian Party
|
|26.35%
|-
|style="background-color:"|
|align=left|Leonid Markelov
|align=left|Liberal Democratic Party
|
|19.03%
|-
|style="background-color:#DA2021"|
|align=left|Anatoly Popov (incumbent)
|align=left|Ivan Rybkin Bloc
|
|11.92%
|-
|style="background-color:"|
|align=left|Gennady Grigoryev
|align=left|Environmental Party of Russia "Kedr"
|
|10.71%
|-
|style="background-color:#FE4801"|
|align=left|Aleksandr Kazimov
|align=left|Pamfilova–Gurov–Lysenko
|
|6.89%
|-
|style="background-color:"|
|align=left|Gennady Oshchepkov
|align=left|Independent
|
|6.71%
|-
|style="background-color:#CE1100"|
|align=left|Valery Loskutov
|align=left|My Fatherland
|
|5.95%
|-
|style="background-color:#000000"|
|colspan=2 |against all
|
|10.32%
|-
| colspan="5" style="background-color:#E9E9E9;"|
|- style="font-weight:bold"
| colspan="3" style="text-align:left;" | Total
| 
| 100%
|-
| colspan="5" style="background-color:#E9E9E9;"|
|- style="font-weight:bold"
| colspan="4" |Source:
|
|}

1999

|-
! colspan=2 style="background-color:#E9E9E9;text-align:left;vertical-align:top;" |Candidate
! style="background-color:#E9E9E9;text-align:left;vertical-align:top;" |Party
! style="background-color:#E9E9E9;text-align:right;" |Votes
! style="background-color:#E9E9E9;text-align:right;" |%
|-
|style="background-color:"|
|align=left|Ivan Kazankov
|align=left|Independent
|
|37.75%
|-
|style="background-color:"|
|align=left|Leonid Markelov
|align=left|Independent
|
|25.44%
|-
|style="background-color:"|
|align=left|Viktor Bogdan
|align=left|Independent
|
|7.00%
|-
|style="background-color:"|
|align=left|Viktor Vasilyev
|align=left|Independent
|
|6.60%
|-
|style="background-color:"|
|align=left|Vyacheslav Paydoverov
|align=left|Independent
|
|6.28%
|-
|style="background-color:#E2CA66"|
|align=left|Vasily Grigoryev
|align=left|For Civil Dignity
|
|3.42%
|-
|style="background-color:"|
|align=left|Nikolay Polyakov (incumbent)
|align=left|Independent
|
|1.96%
|-
|style="background-color:"|
|align=left|Vladimir Mikheev
|align=left|Independent
|
|0.84%
|-
|style="background-color:#FF4400"|
|align=left|Vitaly Lezhanin
|align=left|Andrey Nikolayev and Svyatoslav Fyodorov Bloc
|
|0.73%
|-
|style="background-color:#F1043D"|
|align=left|Aleksey Popov
|align=left|Socialist Party of Russia
|
|0.55%
|-
|style="background-color:"|
|align=left|Leonid Loskutov
|align=left|Independent
|
|0.52%
|-
|style="background-color:"|
|align=left|Vladimir Maskimov
|align=left|Independent
|
|0.39%
|-
|style="background-color:"|
|align=left|Vitaly Trubitsin
|align=left|Independent
|
|0.39%
|-
|style="background-color:"|
|align=left|Gennady Khrolenko
|align=left|Independent
|
|0.30%
|-
|style="background-color:#000000"|
|colspan=2 |against all
|
|5.77%
|-
| colspan="5" style="background-color:#E9E9E9;"|
|- style="font-weight:bold"
| colspan="3" style="text-align:left;" | Total
| 
| 100%
|-
| colspan="5" style="background-color:#E9E9E9;"|
|- style="font-weight:bold"
| colspan="4" |Source:
|
|}

2003

|-
! colspan=2 style="background-color:#E9E9E9;text-align:left;vertical-align:top;" |Candidate
! style="background-color:#E9E9E9;text-align:left;vertical-align:top;" |Party
! style="background-color:#E9E9E9;text-align:right;" |Votes
! style="background-color:#E9E9E9;text-align:right;" |%
|-
|style="background-color:"|
|align=left|Valery Komissarov
|align=left|United Russia
|
|44.17%
|-
|style="background-color:"|
|align=left|Ivan Kazankov (incumbent)
|align=left|Communist Party
|
|19.03%
|-
|style="background-color:"|
|align=left|Igor Kudryavtsev
|align=left|Agrarian Party
|
|7.12%
|-
|style="background-color:"|
|align=left|Vyacheslav Kislitsyn
|align=left|Independent
|
|5.94%
|-
|style="background-color:#DBB726"|
|align=left|Yevgeny Bochkarev
|align=left|Democratic Party
|
|4.35%
|-
|style="background-color:"|
|align=left|Nikolay Svistunov
|align=left|Independent
|
|3.57%
|-
|style="background-color:#164C8C"|
|align=left|Rezeda Gilmanova
|align=left|United Russian Party Rus'
|
|1.31%
|-
|style="background-color:"|
|align=left|Vladimir Karpochev
|align=left|Independent
|
|0.95%
|-
|style="background-color:#7C73CC"|
|align=left|Namik Muradov
|align=left|Great Russia–Eurasian Union
|
|0.37%
|-
|style="background-color:#000000"|
|colspan=2 |against all
|
|11.52%
|-
| colspan="5" style="background-color:#E9E9E9;"|
|- style="font-weight:bold"
| colspan="3" style="text-align:left;" | Total
| 
| 100%
|-
| colspan="5" style="background-color:#E9E9E9;"|
|- style="font-weight:bold"
| colspan="4" |Source:
|
|}

2016

|-
! colspan=2 style="background-color:#E9E9E9;text-align:left;vertical-align:top;" |Candidate
! style="background-color:#E9E9E9;text-align:leftt;vertical-align:top;" |Party
! style="background-color:#E9E9E9;text-align:right;" |Votes
! style="background-color:#E9E9E9;text-align:right;" |%
|-
|style="background-color:"|
|align=left|Sergey Kazankov
|align=left|Communist Party
|
|46.23%
|-
|style="background:"| 
|align=left|Larisa Yakovleva
|align=left|United Russia
|
|37.11%
|-
|style="background-color:"|
|align=left|Oleg Kazakov
|align=left|Independent
|
|4.21%
|-
|style="background-color:"|
|align=left|Albert Fedorov
|align=left|Liberal Democratic Party
|
|3.52%
|-
|style="background:"| 
|align=left|Natalia Glushchenko
|align=left|A Just Russia
|
|3.22%
|-
|style="background:"| 
|align=left|Roman Zolotukhin
|align=left|Rodina
|
|0.93%
|-
|style="background:"| 
|align=left|Yekaterina Ulanova
|align=left|Yabloko
|
|0.90%
|-
|style="background-color:"|
|align=left|Yury Zonov
|align=left|The Greens
|
|0.71%
|-
|style="background-color: " |
|align=left|Denis Shparber
|align=left|Communists of Russia
|
|0.60%
|-
|style="background:"| 
|align=left|Andrey Smyshlyaev
|align=left|Civic Platform
|
|0.53%
|-
| colspan="5" style="background-color:#E9E9E9;"|
|- style="font-weight:bold"
| colspan="3" style="text-align:left;" | Total
| 
| 100%
|-
| colspan="5" style="background-color:#E9E9E9;"|
|- style="font-weight:bold"
| colspan="4" |Source:
|
|}

2021

|-
! colspan=2 style="background-color:#E9E9E9;text-align:left;vertical-align:top;" |Candidate
! style="background-color:#E9E9E9;text-align:left;vertical-align:top;" |Party
! style="background-color:#E9E9E9;text-align:right;" |Votes
! style="background-color:#E9E9E9;text-align:right;" |%
|-
|style="background-color:"|
|align=left|Sergey Kazankov (incumbent)
|align=left|Communist Party
|
|50.36%
|-
|style="background-color:"|
|align=left|Vladimir Kozhanov
|align=left|Independent
|
|17.20%
|-
|style="background-color: " |
|align=left|Natalia Glushchenko
|align=left|A Just Russia — For Truth
|
|7.57%
|-
|style="background-color: " |
|align=left|Ivan Kazankov
|align=left|Communists of Russia
|
|6.86%
|-
|style="background-color:"|
|align=left|Aleksey Sherstobitov
|align=left|Liberal Democratic Party
|
|3.49%
|-
|style="background-color: "|
|align=left|Valentina Zlobina
|align=left|Party of Pensioners
|
|3.35%
|-
|style="background-color: "|
|align=left|Ilya Kulalaev
|align=left|New People
|
|3.21%
|-
|style="background:"| 
|align=left|Andrey Smyshlyaev
|align=left|Rodina
|
|2.04%
|-
|style="background:"| 
|align=left|Sergey Gartvik
|align=left|Civic Platform
|
|0.96%
|-
|style="background-color: "|
|align=left|Vladimir Rovensky
|align=left|Party of Growth
|
|0.61%
|-
| colspan="5" style="background-color:#E9E9E9;"|
|- style="font-weight:bold"
| colspan="3" style="text-align:left;" | Total
| 
| 100%
|-
| colspan="5" style="background-color:#E9E9E9;"|
|- style="font-weight:bold"
| colspan="4" |Source:
|
|}

Notes

References

Russian legislative constituencies
Politics of Mari El